was a Japanese politician from Kushiro, Hokkaido.

Career

He was a member of the House of Representatives of Japan as a member of the multi-member Hokkaido's 4th district. He served alongside Yukio Hatoyama, Tatsuo Takahashi, Shōichi Watanabe and Tadamasa Kodaira.

1929 births
2007 deaths
Japanese politicians
People from Kushiro, Hokkaido